Ask Me Another may refer to:

 Ask Me Another, an NPR and WNYC radio program hosted by Ophira Eisenberg
 A part of the BBC radio quiz show What Do You Know?